Janie Ledlow Shores (April 30, 1932 – August 9, 2017) was a judge on the Supreme Court of Alabama who was the first woman to ever serve on that court. Shores also was considered by President Bill Clinton in 1993 as a possible nominee to the United States Supreme Court.

Early life and education 
A native of Butler County, Alabama, who grew up in Baldwin County, Alabama, Shores attended Judson College and earned a bachelor's degree from Samford University. She also graduated with honors with a law degree from the University of Alabama Law School in 1959. Shores earned an LLM degree from the University of Virginia in 1992.

Professional career 
After graduating law school, Shores practiced law in Selma, Alabama, and also worked on the legal staff of the Liberty National Life Insurance Company from 1961 until 1965. In 1965, Shores became the first full-time female law faculty member in Alabama (and the second in the entire Southeast) when she was hired as a law professor at Cumberland School of Law in Birmingham, Alabama.

Tenure on the Supreme Court of Alabama 
In 1974, Shores ran for and won a seat on the Supreme Court of Alabama as a Democrat, winning the primary and running unopposed in the general election, becoming the first woman ever to be elected to that court. "I hope it has now been demonstrated that women can hold these positions and can be elected in Alabama, and I hope I have had some small part in letting women know to do that is possible," Shores told the Birmingham News in an article that was published on March 29, 1995.

Consideration for nomination to the U.S. Supreme Court 
In 1993, shortly after U.S. Supreme Court Associate Justice Byron White announced his resignation, President Clinton was stymied when his top choice, New York's then-Gov. Mario Cuomo, told him he was not interested. Clinton subsequently asked his staff to expand the search. On May 6, 1993, the Washington Post named Shores as a possible choice for Clinton, particularly since she had served on the Supreme Court of Alabama for four years in the 1970s with then-U.S. Sen. Howell Heflin, who by 1993 was a member of the U.S. Senate Judiciary Committee. On May 15, 1993, the Birmingham News reported that Heflin had said that the White House was giving "careful consideration" to Shores as a nominee.  At a dinner a few weeks earlier, Heflin said that White House Counselor Bernard Nussbaum had "asked me about Janie," the paper reported.

In Jeffrey Toobin's 2007 book The Nine: Inside the Secret World of the Supreme Court, President Clinton is reported to have pulled Shores's name from a list and wondered whether she might make an appropriate Supreme Court nominee. Toobin notes that Shores was "utterly unknown in Washington legal circles and no one – not Clinton or anyone on his staff – had any idea where she stood on constitutional issues or much of anything else." Ultimately, Nussbaum is reported by Toobin to have become "increasingly embarrassed as the names came and went," and "decided to make a stand." Toobin reports that Nussbaum told Clinton, "You are not nominating Janie Shores to the Supreme Court.  No one knows who she is.  This is insane." Toobin notes that Clinton ultimately relented, and later wound up appointing Ruth Bader Ginsburg to the High Court.  For Shores's part, she has said that she was very honored to have even been considered. "It was a great honor to be considered even though I didn't get it," Shores told the Birmingham News in an article that ran on March 29, 1995.

Clinton clearly held some respect for Shores, however. Less than two years later, in January 1995, Clinton appointed Shores to the State Justice Institute, a private, nonprofit entity that provides financial support to projects aimed at improving the administration and quality of state courts.

Retirement 
Shores chose not to run for re-election in 1998. This meant that her final day on the bench was in January 1999.

Shores served as a supernumerary justice until 2001, when Roy Moore, then the Chief Justice of the Supreme Court of Alabama, dismissed her and replaced her with retired Justice Hugh Maddox.

In 2004, Shores served as one of seven members of a special State Supreme Court that considered the appeal of the ouster of Moore as chief justice. The court was chosen at random from a group of retired but still active judges. On April 30, 2004, the panel voted 7–0 not to reinstate Moore.

Shores lived in Fairhope, Alabama.

Death
She died on August 9, 2017, at the age of 85 after suffering a stroke.

See also
List of female state supreme court justices

References

Bibliography
 Toobin, Jeffrey, The Nine: Inside the Secret World of the Supreme Court, Doubleday, New York, 2007, p. 67.

1932 births
2017 deaths
Alabama lawyers
People from Butler County, Alabama
People from Fairhope, Alabama
Judson College (Alabama) alumni
University of Alabama alumni
University of Virginia School of Law alumni
Samford University alumni
Justices of the Supreme Court of Alabama
20th-century American judges
Deaths from cerebrovascular disease
20th-century American women judges
20th-century American lawyers
21st-century American women